Harry Blake (1874–1919) was an American outfielder in Major League Baseball.

Harry Blake may also refer to:
Henry Blake (lighthouse keeper) (1837–1871), first New Dungeness Lighthouse keeper
Henry Arthur Blake (1840–1918), British colonial administrator, Governor-General of Hong Kong
Harry Blake (television personality), participant in Big Brother
Harry Blake, alias of Billy Jones (1889–1940), American tenor
Harry Blake, character in Naughty Marietta

See also
Harold Blake, see New York's 33rd congressional district
Henry Blake (disambiguation)